Dampiera rosmarinifolia, commonly known as rosemary dampiera, is a flowering plant in the family Goodeniaceae.It is a perennial subshrub with linear leaves, mauve or purple flowers borne in leaf axils.

Description
It has ribbed, needle-shaped stems with whitish branched hairs, often becoming smooth with age.

Taxonomy and naming
Dampiera rosmarinifolia was first formally described in 1847 by Diederich Franz Leonhard von Schlechtendal and the description was published in Linnaea: ein Journal für die Botanik in ihrem ganzen Umfange, oder Beiträge zur Pflanzenkunde.The specific epithet (rosmarinifolia) means "rosemary leaved".

Distribution and habitat
Rosemary dampiera grows usually in low-rainfall areas in mallee, scrub and sandy soils in north-western Victoria to the Eyre Peninsula in South Australia.

References

rosmarinifolia
Flora of South Australia
Flora of Victoria (Australia)
Endemic flora of Australia
Plants described in 1847